Uragano was a  that served with the Italian Navy during the Second World War. The vessel entered service in 1942 and was sunk by a naval mine on 3 February 1943.

Service history
Uraganos keel was laid down on 17 June 1941 by Cantieri Riuniti dell'Adriatico at Trieste. The ship was launched on 3 May 1942. Construction was completed on 26 September 1942. The ship was sunk by a naval mine on 3 February 1943.

References

Sources

External links
 Historical Ships Marina Militare website

Ciclone-class torpedo boats
1942 ships
Ships sunk by mines
World War II shipwrecks in the Mediterranean Sea
Maritime incidents in February 1943
Ships built in Trieste